Häberlin, anglicized Haberlin or Haeberlin, is a Germanic surname common in Germany, Austria, and Switzerland. Through widespread diffusion of ethnic Germans during the late 1700s to early 1900s across Northeastern Europe, the name is also common in countries such as the Czech Republic, Poland, and Lithuania. The name has its origins in an Old German term meaning 'grower of oats'. In Switzerland it is often rendered as Haeberli. It may refer to:

 Brian Haberlin (born 1963), comic book creator
 Eduard Häberlin (1820–1884), Swiss politician
 Friedrich Heinrich Häberlin (1834–1897), Swiss politician, brother of Eduard
 Georg Heinrich Häberlin (1644–1699), German Lutheran theologian
 Heinrich Häberlin (1868–1947), Swiss politician, son of Friedrich Heinrich and nephew of Eduard
 Paul Häberlin (1878–1960), Swiss philosopher
 Carl Haeberlin (1870–1954), sometimes also spelled Häberlin, German physician and natural historian
 Herman Karl Haeberlin (1890–1918), German-American anthropologist
 Paul Haeberlin (chef) (1923–2008), French chef
 Carl von Häberlin (1832–1911), German painter

See also 
 Häberli

German-language surnames
Swiss-German surnames